, also known as or , was a Japanese artist of the Utagawa school.

Life and career

Born the son of teahouse proprietor Asakusa Tamichi in 1833, Yoshiiku became a student of ukiyo-e artist Utagawa Kuniyoshi toward the end of the 1840s. His earliest known work dates to 1852 when he provided the backgrounds to some actor prints by his master.

Yoshiiku's earliest works were portraits of actors (yakusha-e), beauties (bijin-ga), and warriors (musha-e). He later followed Kuniyoshi into making satirical and humorous pieces, and became the leading name in the field after Kuniyosh's death in 1861. He illustrated the Tokyo Nichi Nichi Shimbun ("Tokyo Daily News") from 1874 to 1876, and then co-founded the Tokyo E-iri Shinbun ("Tokyo Illustrated News"). The latter folded in 1889, and Yoshiiku returned to making prints. He struggled during his last years, and his last known print appeared in 1903. His three known students, Ikumura, Ikuei, and Ikumasa, failed to achieve recognition.

Yoshiiku had ten children with his second wife, only one of whom survived childhood. Yoshiiku died at age 71 in a temporary residence on 6 February 1904 in Honjo. He was buried at Anseiji temple in Asakusa and given the posthumous Buddhist name Juzen'in Hōkinikkaku Koji.

Prints
Yoshiiku's works include the print Kokkei Wanisshi-ki ("Comical Record of Japanese History"), which employs the traditional theme of Hyakki Yagyō on contemporary Japanese military actions in China. He cooperated with Tsukioka Yoshitoshi in the production of the muzan-e ("cruel pictures") series Eimei nijūhasshūku ("Twenty-eight famous murders with verse").

Gallery

See also
 Schools of ukiyo-e artists
 List of ukiyo-e terms

References

Works cited

References
 Lane, Richard. (1978).  Images from the Floating World, The Japanese Print. Oxford: Oxford University Press. ; OCLC 5246796
 Newland, Amy Reigle. (2005). Hotei Encyclopedia of Japanese Woodblock Prints.  Amsterdam: Hotei. ; OCLC 61666175
 Roberts, Laurance P. (1976). A Dictionary of Japanese Artists. New York: Weatherhill. ; OCLC 2005932

External links

 Museum of Fine Arts, Boston: digitized images
 Indianapolis Museum of Art: digitized image
 Brooklyn Museum: digitized images
 Los Angeles County Museum of Art: digitized images

1833 births
1904 deaths
19th-century Japanese painters
Ukiyo-e artists
Yoshiiku